Melquíades Valderrama Sáenz de la Peña (1838–1895) was a Chilean lawyer. He was Minister of Foreign Affairs and Colonization of Chile (1880–1881).

References
«LINEA DE TIEMPO DE VALDIVIA». genealog.cl. Consultado el 2 de agosto de 2014.
Volver arriba ↑ Editorial Jurídica de Chile (1871). «Estudios de historia de las Institueiones Politicas y Sociales» (1° edición). p. 30.
Volver arriba ↑ Luis Valencia Avaria (1871). «Anales de la República, Volume 1» (1° edición). p. 500.
Volver arriba ↑ Fernando Moraga (2013). «Gente de La Serena» (1° edición). p. 148.
Volver arriba ↑ Fernando Cristian Sainz de la Peña Rodríguez. «Historia de la familia Sáenz de la Peña» (1° edición). p. 263.

1838 births
1895 deaths
Foreign ministers of Chile
19th-century Chilean lawyers